Alexandre Postel (born 29 April 1982, in Colombes) is a French writer.

A former student at the École normale supérieure de Lyon, Alexandre Postel is currently a Professor of letters in classe préparatoire in Paris.

Bibliography 
 2013: Un homme effacé, Gallimard, series "Blanche"
 2015: L'Ascendant, Gallimard, series "Blanche"
 2016: Les Deux Pigeons, Gallimard, series "Blanche"

References

External links 
 Alexandre Postel on Babelio
 Le Goncourt du premier roman récompense une descente aux enfers on BibliObs (21 March 2013)
 L’Ascendant d’Alexandre Postel on Une Pause littéraire
 Alexandre Postel - Un homme effacé on YouTube

21st-century French novelists
Prix Goncourt du Premier Roman recipients
ENS Fontenay-Saint-Cloud-Lyon alumni
People from Colombes
1982 births
Living people